Eman Markovic (born 8 May 1999) is a Norwegian footballer who plays as a winger for Swedish Allsvenskan club IFK Göteborg.

Club career

Zrinjski Mostar
On 1 June 2018, Markovic signed his first professional 2-year contract with Premier League of Bosnia and Herzegovina club HŠK Zrinjski Mostar.

He made his league debut for Zrinjski on 5 August 2018 in a 2–0 away loss against FK Željezničar Sarajevo.

He scored his first goal for Zrinjski in a 1–0 win against FK Krupa on 30 November 2018. Markovic decided to leave Zrinjski on 8 July 2019.

International career
Born in Norway, Markovic is of Bosnian descent. He represented the Norway national under-19 football team in the 2018 UEFA European Under-19 Championship after the team qualified for the tournament for the first time since 2005, with Markovic scoring 4 goals in the qualifiers.

He scored two goals at the final tournament, including one in a 3–0 win against England which gave Norway a spot in the 2019 FIFA U-20 World Cup, the first time the country qualified for it since 1993.

Career statistics

References

External links

1999 births
Living people
People from Kvinesdal
Norwegian footballers
Norway youth international footballers
Norway under-21 international footballers
Norwegian people of Bosnia and Herzegovina descent
Association football midfielders
Molde FK players
HŠK Zrinjski Mostar players
IK Start players
IFK Norrköping players
IFK Göteborg players
Norwegian First Division players
Eliteserien players
Premier League of Bosnia and Herzegovina players
Allsvenskan players
Norwegian expatriate footballers
Expatriate footballers in Bosnia and Herzegovina
Sportspeople from Agder